A Far Country is a novel by American writer Winston Churchill published in 1915.

Plot introduction

The book follows the career of Hugh Paret from youth to manhood, and how his profession as a corporation lawyer gradually changes his values.

The title is a reference to the Parable of the Prodigal Son, where Luke 15:13 (KJV) provides that the son went "into a far country, and there wasted his substance with riotous living."

Reception
The book received positive reviews, and was the second best-selling novel in the United States in 1915.

References

External links
 
 
Full book scan of 1915 Canadian printing via Google Books

1915 American novels
Novels by Winston Churchill (novelist)